Several ships have been named :

 , the lead ship of her class during World War II
 , a class of destroyer built for the Imperial Japanese Navy
 , a submarine of the Imperial Japanese Navy, code-named Matsu
 JDS Matsu (PF-286), a Kusu-class patrol frigate of the Japan Maritime Self-Defense Force, formerly USS Charlottesville (PF-25)

See also 
 Matsu (disambiguation)

Imperial Japanese Navy ship names
Japanese Navy ship names